Red Hot is a 1993 Canadian drama film directed by Paul Haggis. The film was Haggis' feature film directorial debut. Filmed in Riga, Latvia, it is set in Soviet Union-time Riga of 1950s.

Plot
Alexi, a poor music school student in Riga in 1957, is gifted some contraband American rock and roll records from his traveling uncle Dimitri. Alexi gains work as a music tutor for his fellow student Valentina, the daughter of a wealthy KGB commander, and gives her a copy of one of the records recorded onto an X-ray. A record dropped by Alexi on the street is found by a KGB officer named Gurevitch, who begins investigating Valentina and her parents.

In order to secretly form a band, Alexi and his friends Yorgi and Yuri buy American instruments from the black market dealer Leonid, who also provides information to Gurevitch. Dimitri is arrested by Gurevitch but Valentina's father Mr. Kirov has Gurevitch transferred to Kurdistan and destroys all records of the investigation. Valentina stops meeting with Alexi at the request of her father.

Alexi skips his audition to get into the academy and instead goes to an abandoned warehouse where his band is to perform a secret concert that night. After giving their audition performances, the other students from the school attend the concert as well. Gurevitch informs the KGB, who arrive with tanks and arrest Valentina and Alexi. Alexi serves seven years in prison, after which he and Valentina escape to Oslo and request political asylum.

Cast
Balthazar Getty as Alexi
Carla Gugino as Valentina
Jan Niklas as Yorgi
Hugh O'Conor as Yuri
Armin Mueller-Stahl as Dimitri
Donald Sutherland as Kirov
George de la Peña as Gurevitch
Martin McKellan as Leonid

References

External links

1993 films
1993 directorial debut films
1990s high school films
1990s musical drama films
1993 romantic drama films
Canadian musical drama films
Canadian romantic drama films
English-language Canadian films
Columbia Pictures films
Films about music and musicians
Films about musical groups
Films directed by Paul Haggis
Films set in 1957
Films set in Riga
Canadian independent films
Films with screenplays by Paul Haggis
Canadian rock music films
1990s English-language films
1990s Canadian films